Don Number One is a 2012 crime-drama Bangladeshi film directed by Badiul Alam Khokon. The film stars Shakib Khan in the lead role and was released on Eid-ul-Adha of 27 October 2012. It is an unofficial remake of Indian Telugu movie Don (2007).

Cast
 Shakib Khan as Raja / King Khan / Don
 Sahara as Lalita
 Misha Sawdagor
 Uzzal
 Prabir Mitra
 Khaleda Aktar Kolpona
 Elias Kobra
 Sanko Panja
 Shiba Shanu
 Mehedi
 Sheuli Shila
 Kotha
 Pirzada Shahidul Harun
 Gulshan Ara Ahmed

Production

Soundtrack

Awards
Meril Prothom Alo Awards
Won: Best Actor - Shakib Khan

References

2012 films
2012 action films
Bengali-language Bangladeshi films
Bangladeshi action films
Bangladeshi remakes of Indian films
Bangladeshi gangster films
Films scored by Shawkat Ali Emon
Bangladeshi remakes of Telugu films
2010s Bengali-language films